Western Pacific 94 is a 4-6-0 Ten Wheeler type steam locomotive built in 1909 by the American Locomotive Company for the Western Pacific Railroad. It is preserved on display at the Western Railway Museum in Suisun City, California. This locomotive was the first steam locomotive to travel on the Feather River Route.

History
This locomotive has attended the Western Pacific's Golden Spike ceremony at Keddie, California, on November 1, 1909. For the 50th anniversary of the Western Pacific, it was painted with gold stripes and pulled a special train into Oakland, California. After steam ended on the Western Pacific, 94 was held for special events by the railroad, on August 22, 1960, the engine was on the point of the California Zephyr, and also starred in the Disney movie "Pollyanna," which was released the same year. After 55 years on the Western Pacific, 94 was donated to the Maritime Museum in San Francisco in 1964, in 1966 the engine was placed in storage at Key System's Maintenance Building. 

In 1979, the Western Railway Museum acquired 94, and the engine was moved from Oakland to Rio Vista Junction in April of that year. By the end of 1979, the locomotive was under steam at the museum. It was used in excursion service for the Museum until 1986.

As of 2021, No. 94 is on static display inside the Western Railway Museum. Due to the locomotive’s poor mechanical condition, it will likely never run under steam again.

References

External links
 
 
 

4-6-0 locomotives
94
ALCO locomotives
Railway locomotives introduced in 1909
Individual locomotives of the United States
Standard gauge locomotives of the United States
Preserved steam locomotives of California